Alloway is a rural locality in the Bundaberg Region, Queensland, Australia. In the  Alloway had a population of 490 people.

Clayton is a neighbourhood in the north of the locality.

Geography 
Alloway is flat land about 30 metres above sea level used for farming, predominantly the growing of sugarcane. The Elliott River comprises the southern boundary of the locality. The North Coast railway line passed through the locality from south to north with the locality served by the Elliott railway station.

History 
The name Alloway is taking from the railway siding, which was in turned named after Alloway, Ayrshire, Scotland (the birthplace of Robert Burns) on 8 July 1939 by the Queensland Railways Department.

Elliott State School opened on 4 February 1886 and it is believed there was a "school at Bingera and Baranyan Homestead near Bundaberg" on the site prior to this. In 1960, it was renamed Alloway State School.

Clayton State School opened on 31 July 1930 on a  site donated by Mrs Ernestina Julia Sarah Natzke. It closed in 1947 but reopened in 1952. It closed permanently on 31 December 1971. On 16 January 1989 the Queensland Government decided to returned  land to Mrs Ernestina Crank, the daughter and sole beneficiary of Mrs Natzke who had died in August 1988. The school was at 430 Clayton Road.

In the  Alloway had a population of 490 people.

Education 
Alloway State School is a government co-educational primary school (P-6) at 4334 Goodwood Road. In 2016, the school had an enrolment of 51 students with 6 teachers (3 equivalent full-time) and 5 non-teaching staff (3 equivalent full-time). Alloway State school opened on 1 February 1886.

References

Further reading 
 

Bundaberg Region
Localities in Queensland